The 7th National Television Awards ceremony was held at the Royal Albert Hall on 23 October 2001 and was hosted by Sir Trevor McDonald.

Awards

References

National Television Awards
National Television Awards
National Television Awards
2001 in London
National Television Awards
National Television Awards